2nd Filmfare Awards East ceremony, presented by the Filmfare Magazine, honored the best Bengali language Indian films of 2016. The ceremony was held on 25 February 2017 and was co-hosted by Jisshu Sengupta and Abir Chatterjee.

Winners and nominees

Main Awards 
The nominees for the 2nd Filmfare Awards East were announced on 22 February 2017.

Critics' awards

Technical Awards

Special awards

Multiple Nominations
 Shaheb Bibi Golaam – 12
 Praktan - 10
 Cinemawala - 8
 Zulfiqar - 7
 Shankhachil - 5
 Bastu-Shaap - 5
 Eagoler Chokh - 4
 Gangster - 3
 Shororipu - 3
 Double Feluda - 2
 Antarleen - 2

Multiple Awards
 Shaheb Bibi Golaam - 6
 Cinemawala - 5
 Praktan 5
 Shankhachil - 2
 Cholai - 2

References

Filmfare Awards
2016 film awards
2016 in India
Events of The Times Group